Girolamo Arnaldi (31 January 1929 – 30 January 2016) was an Italian historian.

He was professor of Medieval History at the University of Bologna from 1964 to 1970 and at the Sapienza University of Rome from 1970 to 1999.

Arnaldi was the author of several historical essays, and his researches mainly focused on the role of Italy and of the papacy in shaping the medieval civilization.  He also directed several collective works such as the Encyclopaedia of the Popes and the Enciclopedia Fridericiana for Treccani.  He collaborated with RAI for the documentary series La straordinaria storia dell’Italia. His last book was L’Italia e i suoi invasori (2002), which in 2005 was translated in English and published by Harvard University Press with the title Italy and Its Invaders.

Honour 
 : Knight Grand Cross of the Order of Merit of the Italian Republic (27 december 1993)

References 

 

1929 births
2016 deaths
People from Pisa
20th-century Italian historians
University of Naples Federico II alumni
Academic staff of the Sapienza University of Rome
Academic staff of the University of Bologna
Knights Grand Cross of the Order of Merit of the Italian Republic